The 2004 British Grand Prix (formally the 2004 Formula 1 Foster's British Grand Prix) was a Formula One motor race held at the Silverstone Circuit on 11 July 2004. It was Race 11 of 18 in the 2004 FIA Formula One World Championship.

Background
The race was preceded by a demonstration of contemporary Formula One cars on Regent Street in London, including former British Formula One World Champion Nigel Mansell driving the Jordan EJ14. The event attracted an estimated 500,000 spectators.

The event was also notable for the death of Minardi Sporting Director John Walton, who died of a heart attack following the street demonstration, causing the Minardi team to withdraw its cars from Saturday's early practice session.

Friday drivers
The bottom 6 teams in the 2003 Constructors' Championship were entitled to run a third car in free practice on Friday. These drivers drove on Friday but did not compete in qualifying or the race.

Classification

Qualifying

Race

Championship standings after the race 
Bold text indicates who still has a theoretical chance of becoming World Champion.

Drivers' Championship standings

Constructors' Championship standings

Only the top five positions are included for both sets of standings.

References

British Grand Prix
British Grand Prix
Grand Prix
British Grand Prix